Laura Sabia,  (September 18, 1916 – October 17, 1996) was a Canadian social activist and feminist.

Born Laura Villela in Montreal, Quebec, the daughter of Italian immigrants, she played an important part, in the National Chair of the Committee for the Equality of Women, in the creation of the Royal Commission on the Status of Women called by Prime Minister Lester B. Pearson in February 1967. Sabia received her education at Ville-Marie Convent and McGill University. While in Montreal, Laura was noted as the first female to be a part of St. Catharines Separate School Board in 1953, additionally being the president of multiple disciplines including YMCA and the Community Lecture Series. She was a founding member and, from 1969 to 1973, the first president, of the National Action Committee on the Status of Women. She was an alderwoman for St. Catharines City Council and wrote columns for The Toronto Sun in the 1970s and 80s. She also held the president position at the Canadian Federation of University Women and used her position to reach and inspire woman into pursuing higher education politics. Sabia's contribution continued onto 1975 when she and 10 other women participated in a project for International Women at the United Nations Conference.

Sabia was a two-time candidate for the Progressive Conservative Party of Canada. In the 1968 general election, she finished second in the riding of St. Catharines, Ontario, losing by fewer than 4,000 votes, and came in third in a 1981 by-election in the Toronto riding of Spadina, losing by 1,005 votes.

In 1974, she was made an Officer of the Order of Canada "for her devoted service to the cause of the status of women". In 1983, she was awarded the Governor General's Awards in Commemoration of the Persons Case.

She was married to Michael Sabia and had four children, including Michael John, former head of Bell Canada Enterprises, who is married to Hilary Pearson, the granddaughter of former Prime Minister Lester Pearson.

She died of Parkinson's disease on October 17, 1996, in Toronto, Ontario.

References

 
 
Sabia, L. (1966, April).Canadians- Awake! Women Speaking. p. 6
(1965, October 23). ‘Greatest Discrimination’ Levelled At Universities. Women.
(1966, October 6) Never under-estimate the power of a Mrs. M. J. Sabia. Toronto Daily Star.
(1967, November 27). Feminist asks men for rights, less love. Globe and Mail.
(1974, February 19). Woman-power thrust of Sabia’s sorties. Kitchener-Waterloo Record, p. 43.
(1974, December 11). Laura Sabia. The St.Catharines Standard.

External links
 CBC.ca March 28, 1967 Television broadcast: Canadian feminists fight for change

1916 births
1996 deaths
Canadian columnists
Canadian feminists
Deaths from Parkinson's disease
Neurological disease deaths in Ontario
Canadian people of Italian descent
Officers of the Order of Canada
Ontario candidates for Member of Parliament
Journalists from Montreal
Politicians from Montreal
Women in Ontario politics
Canadian women journalists
St. Catharines city councillors
Canadian women columnists
20th-century Canadian women writers
20th-century Canadian non-fiction writers
Progressive Conservative Party of Canada candidates for the Canadian House of Commons
Candidates in the 1968 Canadian federal election
Writers from Montreal
Women municipal councillors in Canada
20th-century Canadian women politicians
Canadian women non-fiction writers
Governor General's Award in Commemoration of the Persons Case winners